The Isarog striped shrew-rat or Mount Isarog striped rat (Chrotomys gonzalesi) is a species of rodent in the family Muridae found only in the Philippines.

Its natural habitat is subtropical or tropical dry forests.

References

Rats of Asia
Endemic fauna of the Philippines
Fauna of Luzon
Rodents of the Philippines
Mammals described in 1991
Chrotomys
Taxonomy articles created by Polbot